Johann Michael Knapp (10 March 1791, Stuttgart - 22 October 1861, Stuttgart) was a German court architect in Württemburg.

Biography 
His father, also named Johann Michael, originally came from Ditzingen and was a Master baker. His mother, Elisabetha, née Bauder was from Waiblingen. From 1808 to 1809, he attended the Polytechnic School in Karlsruhe ( now part of the Karlsruhe Institute of Technology). After 1815, he pursued his artistic studies with Johann Heinrich von Dannecker. This was followed by an  apprenticeship in Milan (1818).

He lived in Rome from 1819 to 1840. There, he was a member of the local , also known as the "Ponte Molle Society". He continued to design projects for his hometown. In 1820, together with Giovanni Salucci, he drew the construction plans for the Württemberg Mausoleum; on commission from Queen Katharina Pawlowna.

A trip to Naples in 1821 took him to Pompeii. Later, from 1829 to 1832, he worked on researching and illustrating ancient Etruscan and Hellenistic monuments in Italy and Sicily. He was named a member of the Pontifical Academy of Fine Arts and Letters of the Virtuosi al Pantheon in 1840. That same year, he accepted an appointment as Court Architect in Württemberg and returned home. 

In 1843, he and  published Denkmale der christlichen Religion oder Sammlung der christlichen Kirchen Roms. Rom 1822–27. Auch: Die Basiliken des christlichen Roms. Mit 50 Kupfertafeln (Monuments of the Christian Religion in Rome). 

He married Josephine Sofie Haag in 1837. They were divorced in 1849.

Major works 

 1855-1859: The Late Classical Königsbau, designed together with Christian Friedrich von Leins.

References

Further reading 
 
 Gotthard Reinhold: Johann Michael Knapp (1791–1861). Eine Studie über Leben, Werk und Nachlaß des Stuttgarter Hofbaumeisters. Backnang 1994

External links 

1791 births
1861 deaths
19th-century German architects
Court architects
Pontifical Academy of Fine Arts and Letters of the Virtuosi al Pantheon
Architects from Stuttgart